"Boondocks" is a song co-written and recorded by American country music group Little Big Town.  It was released in May 2005 as the first single from their second studio album The Road to Here.  It became their first Top 10 hit on the U.S. Billboard Hot Country Songs charts.  It was written by Karen Fairchild, Kimberly Roads, Phillip Sweet, Jimi Westbrook and Wayne Kirkpatrick. The song is one of the band's most enduring and popular hits and they often perform it at the end of their concerts.

Background and writing
Originally, the song was titled "Waiting For the Sun to Go Down". According to Karen Fairchild, one of the group's members, "When we wrote it, it just wasn't there... We kind of set it aside for a few days and then Wayne [Kirkpatrick, one of the song's co-writers] came back." The group later decided on turning the song into a Southern anthem, at which point Kirkpatrick suggested "I'm born and raised in the boondocks" (The line "waiting for the sun to go down" was transferred to "Bones", another song on the band's album).

Content
"Boondocks" is an up-tempo song whose main theme is of rural pride ("I feel no shame, I'm proud of where I came from / I was born and raised in the boondocks"). In the song, all four of the group's members trade off lead and harmony vocals, with all four members singing in various combinations throughout. Jerry Douglas plays Dobro.

Music video
A music video, directed by Roger Pistole, was released for the song. The music video was filmed in Watertown, Tennessee.

The video topped CMT's Top Twenty Countdown for the week of January 26, 2006.

Other notable versions
 Etta James recorded an R&B version for her 2011 album The Dreamer.
 Several characters from Big Idea Entertainment's VeggieTales series of media covered the song for the 2012 album Bob and Larry Go Country. This version is 1 pitch lower.
 Home Free, a country, a capella group, covered the song as a mashup with The Nitty Gritty Dirt Band's 'Fishin' in the Dark' for their 2015 album Country Evolution.

Chart performance
"Boondocks" debuted at #59 on the U.S. Billboard Hot Country Songs for the week of June 4, 2005; it eventually peaked at #9. On the Billboard Hot 100, the single peaked at #46, becoming their first single to appear on the chart.

Certifications

References

External links

 Lyrics to Boondocks

2005 singles
Little Big Town songs
Songs written by Karen Fairchild
Songs written by Kimberly Schlapman
Songs written by Phillip Sweet
Songs written by Jimi Westbrook
Songs written by Wayne Kirkpatrick
Equity Music Group singles
Etta James songs
2005 songs